Gustaf Erik Hedman (1777 – 1841) was a Finnish painter.

Hedman was born in Oulu, and married to Elisabeth Margaretha. He studied at the Royal Swedish Academy of Arts. He primarily painted religious-themed works for church commissions. His works include murals and altarpieces at the Esse (1816) and Vähäkyrö (1819) churches. He has also painted furniture.

References

1777 births
1841 deaths
People from Oulu
18th-century Finnish painters
18th-century male artists
Finnish male painters
19th-century Finnish painters
19th-century Finnish male artists